The Yron is a  long river in the Lorraine (region) of northeastern France. It rises in Vigneulles-lès-Hattonchâtel and runs generally northeast to join the Orne river at Conflans-en-Jarnisy.

References

Rivers of France
Rivers of Grand Est
Rivers of Meuse (department)
Rivers of Meurthe-et-Moselle